William Ó Deorádhain, Irish Professor of Jurisprudence, died 1405.

The Annals of Ulster, sub anno 1405, record the death of William Ua Deoradhain, namely, the best ollam of Leinster in jurisprudence.

He may have been related to Bishop of Leighlin Mauricius Ó Deóradháin, O.P., who was appointed 19 January 1524.

See also
 Early Irish law

External links
 Irish Times
 UCC

14th-century Irish judges
15th-century Irish judges
1405 deaths
Year of birth unknown